2594 Acamas  is a mid-sized Jupiter trojan from the Trojan camp, approximately  in diameter. It was discovered on 4 October 1978, by American astronomer Charles Kowal at the Palomar Observatory in California. The dark Jovian asteroid has a longer-than average rotation period of 26 hours and possibly an elongated shape. It was named after the Thracian leader Acamas from Greek mythology.

Orbit and classification 

Acamas is a dark Jovian asteroid in a 1:1 orbital resonance with Jupiter. It is located in the trailering Trojan camp at the Gas Giant's  Lagrangian point, 60° behind on its orbit . It is also a non-family asteroid of the Jovian background population.

It orbits the Sun at a distance of 4.6–5.5 AU once every 11 years and 5 months (4,159 days; semi-major axis of 5.06 AU). Its orbit has an eccentricity of 0.08 and an inclination of 6° with respect to the ecliptic. The body's observation arc begins with a precovery taken at Palomar in September 1953, or 25 years prior to its official discovery observation.

Physical characteristics 

Acamas is an assumed, carbonaceous C-type asteroid, while most larger Jupiter trojans are D-type asteroids.

Rotation period 

In September 2013, a rotational lightcurve of Acamas was obtained from photometric observations in the R-band by astronomers at the Palomar Transient Factory in California. Lightcurve analysis gave a rotation period of  hours with a brightness amplitude of 0.50 magnitude. A high brightness variation typically indicates that the body has an elongated rather than spherical shape.

Diameter and albedo 

According to the survey carried out by the NEOWISE mission of NASA's Wide-field Infrared Survey Explorer, Acamas measures 25.87 kilometers in diameter and its surface has an albedo 0.06, while the Collaborative Asteroid Lightcurve Link assumes a standard albedo for a carbonaceous asteroid of 0.057 and calculates a diameter of 19.21 kilometers based on an absolute magnitude of 12.31.

Naming 

This minor planet was named by IAU's Minor Planet Names Committee from Greek mythology after the warrior Acamas (son of Eussorus), ally of Troy and leader of the Thracian contingent during the Trojan War. He was killed by Ajax.

The name was suggested by Frederick Pilcher and published by the Minor Planet Center on 6 February 1993.

References

External links 
 Asteroid Lightcurve Database (LCDB), query form (info )
 Dictionary of Minor Planet Names, Google books
 Discovery Circumstances: Numbered Minor Planets (1)-(5000) – Minor Planet Center
 Asteroid 2594 Acamas at the Small Bodies Data Ferret
 
 

002594
Discoveries by Charles T. Kowal
Named minor planets
19781004